Novohryhorivka is a village in Horlivka Raion (district) in Donetsk Oblast of eastern Ukraine, at 61.9 km NE from the centre of Donetsk city, at 3 km NNE from Debaltseve.


History

War in Donbas
During the Battle of Debaltseve in the beginning of 2015 some local residents were evacuated from the village and the settlement was taken under control of pro-Russian forces.

Demographics
The settlement had 475 inhabitants in 2001, native language distribution as of the Ukrainian Census of 2001:
Ukrainian: 87.58%
Russian: 12.21%
 other languages: 0.21%

References

Villages in Horlivka Raion